Surasak Koomgun is a professional footballer from Thailand. He is currently playing as an attacking midfielder.

References

External links
 
 http://player.7mth.com/393713/index.shtml
 https://www.siamsport.co.th/player/397184/surasak-koomgun

1989 births
Living people
Surasak Koomgun
Association football midfielders
Surasak Koomgun
Surasak Koomgun
Surasak Koomgun